The Hum Award for Best Designer Womenswear is one of the Hum Awards presented annually by the Hum Television Network and Entertainment Channel (HTNEC) to Luxury Prêt Fashion designers of Womenswear who has achieved outstanding recognition within the fashion industry. Since its inception, however, the award has commonly been referred to as the hum for Best Designer Womenswear . Nominations are made by Hum members who are designers, while winners are selected by hum membership as a whole.

History
Hum Television Network and Entertainment Channel presented this award to one of the most promising Designer of Womenswear of fashion Industry of Pakistan. As of first ceremony [Nomi Ansari] was honored at 1st Hum Awards ceremony 2012 for his spectacular fashion achievements of outlet & symbol DNA-Diffusion By Nomi Ansari.

Winners and nominees
In the list below, winners are listed first in the colored row, followed by the other nominees. As of the first ceremony, six Designer Womenswear were nominated for their achievements for this award.

Date and the award ceremony shows that the 2010 is the period from 2010-2020 (10 years-decade), while the year above winners and nominees shows their fashion achievements year, and the figure in bracket shows the ceremony number, for example; an award ceremony is held for their achievements of its previous year.

2010s

See also 
 Hum Awards
 Hum Awards pre-show
 List of Hum Awards Ceremonies

References

External links
Official websites
 Hum Awards official website
 Hum Television Network and Entertainment Channel (HTNEC)
 Hum's Channel at YouTube (run by the Hum Television Network and Entertainment Channel)
 Hum Awards at Facebook (run by the Hum Television Network and Entertainment Channel)]

Hum Awards
Hum Award winners
Hum TV
Hum Network Limited